Wang Chau (橫洲) is the name of two places in Hong Kong:

 Wang Chau (Sai Kung), an island of Sai Kung District
 Wang Chau (Yuen Long), an area of Yuen Long District

See also
 Wang Chao (disambiguation)